Ng Wing-Nga (born 13 December 1962) is an archer from Hong Kong.

Archery

Wing-Nga competed in the 1984 Summer Olympic Games. She came 45th with 2148 points scored in the women's individual event.

References

External links 
 Profile on worldarchery.org

1962 births
Living people
Hong Kong female archers
Olympic archers of Hong Kong
Archers at the 1984 Summer Olympics